Podvetrenno-Teleutskoye is a rural locality (a selo) in Teleutsky Selsoviet, Kamensky District, Altai Krai, Russia. The population was 50 as of 2013. There are 5 streets.

Geography 
Podvetrenno-Teleutskoye is located 49 km southwest of Kamen-na-Obi (the district's administrative centre) by road. Vetrenno-Teleutskoye is the nearest rural locality.

References 

Rural localities in Kamensky District, Altai Krai